Giorgio Rubino (born 15 April 1986 in Rome) is an Italian race walker, bronze medal in the 20 km walk at the 2009 World Championships in Berlin.

Biography
The medals of some of the athletics world championship races in 2009 were otherwise awarded 24 March 2016 as a result of doping disqualifications. Among these reallocations also the medals of 20 km walk, which saw the Italian Giorgio Rubino, initially 4th, get the bronze medal This fact, 7 years after the event, allowed Italy to clear the zero in the Medal table. He also has won other four medals, three of these at senior level, in international competitions, and is a five-time winner at the Italian Championships.

Achievements

National titles
Italian Athletics Championships
10,000 metres walk: 2012
20 km walk: 2005
Italian Indoor Athletics Championships
5000 metres walk: 2006, 2012, 2013

See also
 Italian team at the running events
 Italy at the IAAF World Race Walking Cup
 Italy at the European Race Walking Cup - Multiple medalists
 Italian all-time lists - 20 km walk

References

External links
 

1986 births
Living people
Italian male racewalkers
Athletes (track and field) at the 2008 Summer Olympics
Athletes (track and field) at the 2012 Summer Olympics
Olympic athletes of Italy
World Athletics Championships athletes for Italy
Athletes from Rome
Mediterranean Games silver medalists for Italy
Mediterranean Games medalists in athletics
Athletes (track and field) at the 2009 Mediterranean Games
Athletics competitors of Fiamme Azzurre
Athletics competitors of Fiamme Gialle
21st-century Italian people